The Fasil Ghebbi is a fortress  located in Gondar, Amhara Region,  Ethiopia. It was founded in the 17th century by Emperor Fasilides and was the home of Ethiopian emperors. Its unique architecture shows diverse influences including Nubian, Indian, Arab, and Baroque characteristics. Because of its historical importance and architecture, the fortress was inscribed as a UNESCO World Heritage Site in 1979. Ghebbi is an Amharic word for a compound or enclosure.

The complex of buildings includes Fasilides' castle, Iyasu I's palace, Dawit III's Hall, Empress Mentewab's castle, a chancellery and library from Yohannes I, a banqueting hall from the emperor Bakaffa, stables, and three churches: Asasame Qeddus Mikael, Elfign Giyorgis and Gemjabet Mariyam.

History 
The origins of the Fasil Ghebbi can be found in the old tradition of Ethiopian emperors traveling around their possessions, living off the produce of the peasants and dwelling in tents. Reflecting this connection, this precinct was frequently referred to as a katama ("camp" or "fortified settlement") or makkababya, the name applied to the imperial camp in the Royal Chronicle of Baeda Maryam.

Emperor Fasilides broke with this tradition of progressing through the territories, and founded the city of Gondar as his capital; its relative permanence makes the city historically important. Within the capital, he commanded the construction of an imposing edifice, the Fasil Gemb or Fasilides castle. The area around the Fasil Gemb was delineated by a wall with numerous gates. Subsequent emperors built their own structures, many of which survive either in whole or part today. Visiting the Fasil Ghebbi in the late 1950s, Thomas Pakenham observed that "dotted among the palaces are what remains of the pavilions and kiosks of the imperial city".
The original buildings were influenced by Nubian, Arab, and Indian architectural design, with later Baroque Architectural styling introduced by Jesuit Missionaries

A large number of the buildings at Fasil Ghebbi did not survive the events of the time, but the place is still rich in buildings that were renovated both by the Italian occupiers in the late 1930s and after Ethiopia regained its independence. The site was declared a World Heritage Site by UNESCO in 1979, which stated in its decision that it faithfully represents modern Ethiopian civilization at north of Lake Tana which appeared in the early 17th century and influenced Ethiopian architecture for many years.

Description 
Fasil Ghebbi covers an area of about 70,000 square meters. To its south lies Adababay, the market place of Gondar, where imperial proclamations were made, troops presented, and criminals executed; it is currently a city park.

Dawit's Hall is in the northern part of the enclosure, adjacent to the building attributed to Bakaffa and the church of Asasame Qeddus Mikael. Often referred to as the "House of Song", Munro-Hay notes that this may be due to a misreading of the Amharic zofan bet ("House of the Divan" or "House of the Throne") as zafan bet ("House of Song"). Munro-Hay describes it as a "substantial one-storey building with a round tower at the southeast corner", with traces of a smaller round tower at  the northeast corner and traces of a square tower at the northwest corner "most of which has collapsed." The interior of the building is a single long hall, which "the usual arched windows and doorways provided light and access". , Dawit's Hall lacks a roof.

Fasil Ghebbi is enclosed by a 900-meter-long curtain wall which is pierced by twelve gates. These are, in counter-clockwise order: Fit Ber (also called Jan Tekle Ber) opening onto Adababay; Wember Ber (Gate of the Judges); Tazkaro Ber (Gate of Funeral Commemoration), which had a bridge destroyed by fighting during the reign of Iyasu II; Azaj Tequre Ber (Gate of Azaj Tequre), which once was connected by a bridge to Adababay Tekle Haymanot church; Adenager Ber (Gate of the Spinners), which was linked by a bridge to Qeddus Rafael church in the weaver's section of Gondar; Qwali Ber (Gate of the Queen's Attendants), next to the modern entrance to Elfin Giyorgis church inside the Enclosure; Imbilta Ber (Gate of the Musicians); Elfign Ber (Gate of the Privy Chamber), which gave access to the private apartments of the Fasil Ghebbi; Balderas Ber (Gate of the Commander of the Cavalry); Ras Ber (Gate of the Ras), also known as Qwarenyoch Ber (Gate of the Qwara people); Ergeb Ber (Gate of Pigeons), also known as Kechin Ashawa Ber (Gate of the Gifts); Inqoye Ber (Gate of Princess Inqoye, the mother of Empress Mentewab; and Gimjabet Mariyam Ber (Gate of the Treasury of Mary), which leads to the churchyard of Gimjabet Mariyam church.

Gallery

3D documentation with terrestrial laser scanning 
The Zamani Project documented  Fasil Ghebbi in the center of Gondar with terrestrial 3D laser scanning. The structures documented include:  the Castle of Emperor Fasilides, the Bakaffa Castle, Dawit III’s Hall, the Castle of Emperor Iyasu, the Royal Library, the Chancellery, the Royal Archive Building .

Some of the textured 3D models, a panorama tour, elevations, sections and plans are available on www.zamaniproject.org.

See also 
List of World Heritage Sites in Ethiopia

References

Further reading 
 Solomon Woredekal, "Restoration of historical monuments of Gondar", Annales d'Ethiopie, 13 (1985), pp. 119-133

External links 
 UNESCO Fact Sheet

World Heritage Sites in Ethiopia
Buildings and structures in Gondar
Palaces in Ethiopia